The full name of the bank is National Bank of Fiji trading as Colonial National Bank.  The bank is as of December 2009 a subsidiary of Bank South Pacific and has the largest branch network in Fiji.  It also has a majority holding in one of the two merchant banks in the country.

History
The Fijian government established the National Bank of Fiji in 1976 on the base of the Savings Bank of Fiji, founded in 1907. After the 1987 coup, the NBF made a push to serve the indigenous Fijian population (in contradistinction to the Fijian population of Indian origin) by introducing new services, expanding its staff by hiring mainly indigenous Fijians, and increasing its lending to indigenous Fijians. In mid-1995 NBF was running bad and doubtful debts of at least F$90 million. By 1996 NBF’s bad and doubtful debts were estimated at over F$220million, or 8 percent of GDP.  In 1998 the government split NBF into a "good bank", which it privatized, and a "bad bank", which took over the non-performing loans. The government essentially raided the national provident fund to fund the bad bank.  In 1999 the financial services group, Colonial Ltd, acquired 51% of National Bank of Fiji, which it renamed Colonial National Bank. In 2000 Colonial Ltd. merged with the Commonwealth Bank. On 27 January 2006 the Commonwealth Bank acquired the remaining 49% stake in Colonial National Bank from the Fiji government. As of December 2009 Papua New Guinea's Bank South Pacific made a complete acquisition of Colonial National from the Commonwealth Bank thus in proceeding months Colonial National will re-brand itself as a branch of BSP.

Notes and references

Sources
 R. Grynberg, D. Munro & M. White. 2002. CRISIS: Collapse of the National Bank of Fiji. USP Book Centre.

Banks of Fiji
1976 establishments in Fiji
Banks established in 1976